CBL-FM (94.1 MHz) is the flagship station of the CBC Music network. It is a non-commercial station, licensed to Toronto, Ontario, and is owned by the Canadian Broadcasting Corporation.

CBL-FM's studios and offices are located at the Canadian Broadcasting Centre, on Front Street West, while its transmitter is located atop the CN Tower.

History

CBL-FM was launched on October 7, 1946, with the callsign VE9EV, as an FM simulcast for 740 CBL. It was the corporation's second FM station behind VE9CB in Montreal (now CBFX-FM). In 1947, its callsign was changed to CBC-FM. The station originally broadcast at 99.1 MHz, but moved to 94.1 in 1966. (The 99.1 frequency was vacant until 1977, when it was assigned to the CKO all-news radio network. CKO ceased operations in 1989, and the frequency was again vacant until it was assigned to CBLA-FM, co-owned with CBL-FM.)

As part of an 18-month trial for a nationwide FM network, CBC-FM began airing separate programming in 1960, playing mostly classical music along with the corporation's other English-language FM stations (CBM-FM Montreal and CBO-FM Ottawa). CBC-FM returned to simulcasting CBL in 1962, but resumed separate programming again in 1964. The station was renamed CBL-FM in 1968. The FM network was rebranded CBC Stereo on November 3, 1975, CBC Radio Two in 1997 and CBC Music in 2018, as it shifted away from mostly classical music, to a mix of adult album alternative, classical, jazz and other genres.

Rebroadcasters

On February 15, 1979, the CRTC approved the CBC's application to operate a new FM transmitter in Belleville on 94.3 MHz (CBBB-FM) and on May 7, 1979, the CRTC also approved the CBC's application to operate a new FM transmitter in Brockville on 104.9 MHz (CBBA-FM), to rebroadcast the programming originating from CBL-FM Toronto. Neither of these transmitters in Belleville and Brockville were implemented and the frequencies were awarded to other broadcasters.

In 1979, CBBK-FM began broadcasting at 92.9 MHz in Kingston. 

In 1983, a rebroadcaster was added at Peterborough operating at 103.9 MHz as CBBP-FM. 

On June 28, 2005, the CRTC approved the CBC's application to change the frequency of its transmitter CBL-FM-1 104.7 to 106.9 MHz (channel 295C1).
This change of frequency was to eliminate significant interference with a local radio station CFBK-FM operating at 105.5 MHz in Huntsville.

References

External links
CBC Toronto
 

BL
BL
Radio stations established in 1946
1946 establishments in Ontario